FitzAlan is an English patronymic surname of Anglo-Norman origin, descending from the Breton knight Alan fitz Flaad (d. 1120), who accompanied king Henry I to England on his succession.  He was grandson of the Seneschal of the Bishop of Dol. The FitzAlan family shared a common patrilineal ancestry with the House of Stuart.

The FitzAlans held the Earldom of Arundel from 1267 to 1580.

Variants of this surname include Fitz-Alan, Fitzalan, Fitzallen, and Fitz Alan. The noble family of bearing this surname would eventually abandon their patronymic in favor of a toponymic surname, Arundel or Arundell, a reference to their title in the Peerage of England, but use of the FitzAlan surname is often retained in the historical literature.

Family members 
Notable people with the surname FitzAlan include:

 Walter Fitz Alan (d. 1177)
 William FitzAlan, Lord of Oswestry (1105–1160), an important Marcher lord and supporter of Empress Matilda, elder brother of Walter Fitz Alan.
 William Fitz Alan, 1st Lord of Oswestry and Clun (died 1210), son of William FitzAlan, Lord of Oswestry, and a Marcher lord under the early Plantagenet kings.
 William Fitz Alan, 2nd Lord of Oswestry and Clun (died 1215), son of William Fitz Alan, 1st Lord of Oswestry and Clun; he came into conflict with King John.
 John Fitzalan, 3rd Lord of Oswestry and Clun (1200–1240), son of William Fitz Alan, 1st Lord of Oswestry and Clun; he married into the d'Aubigny family, thus acquiring the Arundel earldom for the FitzAlans.
 John FitzAlan 6th Earl of Arundel (1223–1267)
 John FitzAlan, 7th Earl of Arundel (1246–1272)
 Richard FitzAlan, 8th Earl of Arundel (1267–1302), who received a writ in 1289, at his majority, summoning him to Parliament; this is thought to perhaps be a creation of another Earldom of Arundel.
 Richard FitzAlan, 1st or 8th Earl of Arundel (1267–1302)
 Edmund FitzAlan, 2nd or 9th Earl of Arundel (1285–1326) (forfeit 1326)
 Richard FitzAlan, 3rd or 10th Earl of Arundel (1313–1376) (restored 1331)
 Richard FitzAlan, 4th or 11th Earl of Arundel (1346–1397) (forfeit 1397)
 Thomas FitzAlan, 5th or 12th Earl of Arundel (1381–1415) (restored 1400)
 John FitzAlan, 6th or 13th Earl of Arundel (1385–1421)
 John FitzAlan, 7th or 14th Earl of Arundel (1408–1435)
 Humphrey FitzAlan, 8th or 15th Earl of Arundel (1429–1438)
 William FitzAlan, 9th or 16th Earl of Arundel (1417–1487)
 Thomas FitzAlan, 10th or 17th Earl of Arundel (1450–1524)
 William FitzAlan, 11th or 18th Earl of Arundel (1476–1544)
 Henry FitzAlan, 12th or 19th Earl of Arundel (1512–1580)
 Eleanor FitzAlan (ca. 1284 – ca. 1328)
 Bryan FitzAlan, Lord FitzAlan (d. 1306)
 Lady Elizabeth FitzAlan (1366–1425)
 Thomas FitzAlan (died 1430), English knight

Henry Fitzalan-Howard, 14th Duke of Norfolk (1815–1860), the 13th Earl of Arundel of the Fourth Creation (1580), revived the use of the Fitzalan surname in the hyphenated form "Fitzalan-Howard". 
Edmund FitzAlan-Howard (1855–1947), son of the 14th Duke of Norfolk was raised up to the Peerage as "Viscount FitzAlan of Derwent" in 1921 when he was appointed Lord Lieutenant of Ireland. 
Lady Marcia Fitzalan-Howard (b. 1953), daughter of the 17th Duke of Norfolk, uses the stage name Marsha Fitzalan as an actress.

Origins

Family Tree

Armorial 
See also:  Category: FitzAlan arms

References 

 
Norman-language surnames
Surnames of Breton origin
Surnames of Norman origin
Surnames of Scottish origin
Patronymic surnames
Surnames from given names